Armin Helfer (born May 31, 1980) is a former Italian professional ice hockey defenceman. Last he played for the HC Pustertal Wölfe of the Alps Hockey League.

He participated at the 2010 IIHF World Championship as a member of the Italian National men's ice hockey team.

References

External links

1980 births
Living people
Brunico SG players
Germanophone Italian people
Ice hockey players at the 2006 Winter Olympics
Italian ice hockey defencemen
EHC Kloten players
HC Milano players
Olympic ice hockey players of Italy
Sportspeople from Bruneck
HC Pustertal Wölfe players
HC Thurgau players
HC TWK Innsbruck players